Nupserha bidentata is a species of beetle in the family Cerambycidae. It was described by Johan Christian Fabricius in 1792, originally under the genus Saperda.

Varietas
 Nupserha bidentula var. apicipennis Breuning, 1956
 Nupserha bidentata var. nigropunctata Breuning, 1953
 Nupserha bidentata var. flavooculata Breuning, 1953
 Nupserha bidentata var. flavulipennis Breuning, 1958
 Nupserha bidentata var. ruficornis Breuning, 1950
 Nupserha bidentata var. immaculata Breuning, 1958
 Nupserha bidentata var. immaculifrons Breuning, 1949
 Nupserha bidentata var. inoculata Breuning, 1953
 Nupserha bidentata var. nigroabdominalis Breuning, 1950
 Nupserha bidentata var. flavicollis Breuning, 1950
 Nupserha bidentata var. nigroreductipennis Breuning, 1950
 Nupserha bidentata var. submaculata Breuning, 1949
 Nupserha bidentata var. holoruficornis Breuning, 1958
 Nupserha bidentula var. bancoensis Lepesme & Breuning, 1951

References

bidentata
Beetles described in 1792